Ji-woon, also spelled Jee-woon or Ji-un, is a Korean masculine given name. The meaning depends on the hanja used to write each syllable of the name. There are 46 hanja with the reading "ji" and 21 hanja with the reading "woon" on the South Korean government's official list of hanja which may be used in given names.

People with this name include:
 Ji-un of Tamna (fl. 483–508), 27th king of Tamna
 Kim Jee-woon (born 1964), South Korean film director and screenwriter
 Kim Ji-woon (footballer) (born Kim Bong-rae, 1990), South Korean footballer
 Zheng Zhiyun (footballer) (born 1995), Chinese footballer of Korean descent

Fictional characters with this name include:
 Kang Ji-woon, from the 2014 television series Angel Eyes
 Ji-Woon Hak, known in-game as "The Trickster", from the 2016 video game Dead by Daylight

See also
 List of Korean given names

References

Korean masculine given names